H50 may refer to:

Television
Hawaii Five-O (1968 TV series), a police procedural drama set in Hawaii, originally aired from 1968 to 1980
Hawaii Five-0 (2010 TV series), the 2010 remake of Hawaii Five-O

Vehicles

 HMS H50, a 1920 British Royal Navy H class submarine
 QH-50 DASH, a U.S. Navy unmanned anti-submarine helicopter
 H50, the third generation of Toyota HiAce

Other

 DSC-H50, a 2008 Sony 9.1 megapixel Cyber-shot H series camera
 ICD-10 code for strabismus

See also
 Hawaii Five-O (disambiguation)